Baron Glendyne, of Sanquhar in the County of Dumfries, is a title in the Peerage of the United Kingdom. It was created on 23 January 1922 for the businessman Sir Robert Nivison, 1st Baronet. He was a senior partner in the firm of R. Nivison and Co, stockbrokers. Nivison had already been created a Baronet on 21 July 1914.  the titles are held by his great-grandson, the fourth Baron, who succeeded his father in 2008.

Barons Glendyne (1922)
Robert Nivison, 1st Baron Glendyne (1849–1930)
John Nivison, 2nd Baron Glendyne (1878–1967)
Robert Nivison, 3rd Baron Glendyne (1926–2008)
John Nivison, 4th Baron Glendyne (b. 1960)
There is currently no heir to the barony.

Arms

References

Kidd, Charles; Williamson, David (editors). Debrett's Peerage and Baronetage (1990 edition). New York: St Martin's Press, 1990.

Baronies in the Peerage of the United Kingdom
Noble titles created in 1922